Andrea Ronchi (born 3 August 1955) is an Italian politician, former Italian Minister of European Affairs.

Biography
Andrea Ronchi was born in Perugia, Umbria. He graduated in political science and worked as journalist. He was a founding member of the National Alliance party.

In 2001, he was  elected to the Chamber of Deputies. He was reelected in 2006 as a member of People of Freedom. In 2005, he was appointed by Gianfranco Fini as National Spokesman for National Alliance. 
He served as Minister of European Affairs into the Berlusconi IV Cabinet from 2008 to 2010. In 2010 Ronchi left The People of Freedom and joined Future and Freedom, the new party founded by Fini.

Shortly after having been appointed as chairman of the National Assembly of the Future and Freedom party on 13 February 2011, Ronchi and other party leaders, like Adolfo Urso, criticized Gianfranco Fini for allegedly departing from centre-right values. Ronchi resigned on 18 May and left the party on 9 July, upon Angelino Alfano's appointment as secretary of The People of Freedom, and founded a new centre-right association, FareItalia.

References

1955 births
Living people
People from Perugia
Italian Social Movement politicians
National Alliance (Italy) politicians
The People of Freedom politicians
Future and Freedom politicians
Government ministers of Italy